China Southern Airlines Flight 3456 (CZ3456/CSN3456) was a scheduled domestic passenger flight from Chongqing Jiangbei International Airport to Shenzhen Huangtian Airport (now Shenzhen Bao'an International Airport). On 8 May 1997, the Boeing 737 performing this route crashed during the second attempt to land in a thunderstorm. 
The flight number 3456 is still used by China Southern and for the Chongqing-Shenzhen route but now with the Airbus A320 family or Boeing 737 Next Generation aircraft.

Background

Aircraft 
The aircraft was a Boeing 737-31B registered as B-2925 and with serial number 27288. The aircraft was delivered to China Southern on 2 February 1994, and had recorded over 8,500 hours before the crash. The aircraft was powered by 2 CFM International CFM56-3C1 turbofan engines.

Flight crew 
The captain in command was 45-year-old Lin Yougui, he had logged more than 12,700 hours of total flying time, including 9,100 hours as Radio Operator and 3,600 hours as a pilot. The first officer was 36-year-old Kong Dexin, he had logged over 15,500 hours of total flying time, of which 11,200 hours as flight engineer and 4,300 hours as a pilot.

Weather 

At 18:00, on 8 May, a severe weather warning was issued: "report to airports, air traffic controls and airline companies: Thunderstorm with strong winds will appear, all departments including the crew who will be taking off should be notified."

Accident 
On 8 May 1997, Flight 3456 took off from Chongqing Jiangbei International Airport at 19:45 local time (UTC+8), expected to arrive Shenzhen Huangtian Airport at 21:30. At 21:07, the Shenzhen Airport approach controller cleared the flight to the approach of Runway 33. At 21:17, the Tower informed the crew "heavy rain on final, advise when spotting the runway". At 21:18:07, the crew stated they have established ILS approach. At 21:18:53, the crew advised ATC that they spotted the approach lightings, and the controller cleared the aircraft to land. The controller was able to see the landing light of the plane, but it was not clear due to the rain. At 21:19:33, the aircraft touched down on the south of the runway, bounced three times, damaged the aircraft's nose gear, hydraulic systems and flaps. The crew decided to go around.

The crew were asked to turn on the transponder to show the ATC their position, but the secondary surveillance radar did not receive any signal from the aircraft, indicated the transponder was off. At 21:23:57, the crew informed the ATC they were on the downwind side, and requested other aircraft to clear off the airspace for Flight 3456's landing. At 21:23:40, the crew declared an emergency and requested to clear the approach again. At the time, the main warning, hydraulic system warning and the gear warning were all triggered in the cockpit. At 21:24:58, the crew asked for a full emergency airfield support. The aircraft then turned around, reported will land towards the south, which was approved. At 21:28:30, the aircraft skidded off the runway, broke into three pieces and caught on fire, killing 33 passengers and 2 crew members.

Crash site 
The first landing attempt was toward north. Debris from the nose gear was found scattered near the southern end of the runway, indicating the left front tyre had exploded during the first touch down. Fallouts including rivets, metal sheets, rubber tube and retaining clip could also be found on the runway surface.

The second landing attempt was toward south. A clear surface scratch from the fuselage was found  from the runway threshold. The central part of the fuselage and the trailing edge of the right wing received the most severe burning damage. A large amount of mire was filled in the deformed cockpit. The rear section was relatively intact, and was the only section not destroyed. The left main gear and the right engine were scattered on the left side of the runway.

Victims

On 9 May 1997, News at 6:30, a national news show aired at TVB Jade, provided a casualty list for the accident.

Cockpit voice recording

In June 2007, an audio recording reputed to be the last 12 minutes 27 seconds recorded by the cockpit voice recorder of Flight 3456 was leaked on the Internet. According to an expert from the Civil Aviation Administration of China, the recording is unlikely to be fake.

See also 

 List of accidents and incidents involving commercial aircraft
 Garuda Indonesia Flight 200
Delta Airlines Flight 191
Flydubai Flight 981
Aeroflot Flight 1492, an accident in which the airplane also bounced off twice upon landing
Pakistan International Airlines Flight 8303

References

External links
 

Airliner accidents and incidents caused by weather
Airliner accidents and incidents caused by pilot error
Aviation accidents and incidents in 1997
Aviation accidents and incidents in China
1997 disasters in China
History of Guangdong
Accidents and incidents involving the Boeing 737 Classic
China Southern Airlines accidents and incidents
1997 meteorology
May 1997 events in Asia
Shenzhen